Route 33 is a state highway in the U.S. state of Rhode Island.

Route description 
Route 33 starts at an intersection with Rhode Island Route 3 in Coventry. It runs north and crosses the South Branch Pawtuxet River before turning east to form a concurrency with Rhode Island Route 117. Route 33 splits off to the northeast and continues along the bank of the South Branch Pawtuxet River. It forms a concurrency with Rhode Island Route 115, crosses over the river, leaves Route 115, and then continues north over the Pawtuxet River. Route 33 crosses over I-295 without an interchange, and ends at Rhode Island Route 2 in Cranston. From the split with New London Avenue in Cranston to the Pawtuxet River, Route 33 runs on the Warwick/West Warwick town line. Route 33 northbound runs in Warwick and Route 33 southbound runs in West Warwick.

History
Most of Route 33, excluding Sandy Bottom Road in Coventry, was an old alignment of Route 3 and Route 1A.

Major intersections

References

External links

2019 Highway Map, Rhode Island

033
Transportation in Kent County, Rhode Island